Victoria Azarenka was the defending champion, but lost to Kim Clijsters in the fourth round.

Clijsters won her second title in Miami by defeating Venus Williams in straight sets.

Seeds
All seeds receive a bye into the second round.

Draw

Finals

Top half

Section 1

Section 2

Section 3

Section 4

Bottom half

Section 5

Section 6

Section 7

Section 8

External links
 Draw and Qualifying draw

2010 WTA Tour
2010 Sony Ericsson Open
Women in Florida